The Bergamo Treasure is a large Lombardic and Ostrogothic hoard found near the city of Bergamo in northern Italy in the nineteenth century. It was mostly acquired by the British Museum in 1897.

Discovery
The hoard was supposedly unearthed in three different graves near Bergamo in the province of Lombardy, Italy. From the 6th century AD, Bergamo was the seat of one of the most important Lombard duchies of northern Italy. Dating from this era, the prestigious items from the grave groups suggest they belonged to important figures at the Lombardic court. After its discovery, most of the treasure was purchased by the British Museum in 1897.

Description
The Bergamo Treasure is largely composed of ecclesiastical and secular jewellery that reflect the contemporary tastes of Lombardic and Ostrogothic cultures. It includes two gold appliqué crosses and seven rectangular gold mounts that were probably attached to an item of clothing, various glass beads and bronze buckles, an agate pendant and several finger-rings and ear-rings. One of the finger rings is incised with the bust of a noble lady wearing a diadem and a pair of pendant earrings, inscribed either side with the lettering 'GUMED/RUTAVE'.

Gallery

See also
Artres Treasure
Domagnano Treasure
Sutri Treasure
Belluno Treasure

References

Further reading
S. Marzinzik, Masterpieces: Early Medieval Art (London, British Museum Press, 2013)
N. Christie, The Lombards (Oxford, Blackwell, 1995)
R. SMITH, A Guide to the Anglo-Saxon and Foreign Teutonic Antiquities in the Department of British and Mediaeval Antiquities. London, p. 155, British Museum Press, 1923
S Fuchs, Die Langobardischen Goldblattkreuze aus der Zone südwärts der Alpen, Archäologisches Institut des Deutschen Reiches Abteilung Rom. Berlin, p. 78, 1938
O. VON HESSEN, Langobardische Goldblattkreuze aus Italien, in W. Hübener (ed) Die Goldblattkreuze des frühen Mittelalters, Veröffentlichung des Alemannischen Instituts Freiburg, 1975

Medieval European objects in the British Museum
Medieval European metalwork objects
Treasure troves of Italy
Italy–United Kingdom relations